Bayou des Cannes (pronounced "DAI KAIN", translated to "bayou of the reeds" or "bayou of the stalks" ) is a waterway in the Mermentau River basin of southern Louisiana.

One of the first settlers of the area was Fabien and Louis Richard. The scenery of the area contained slow moving water, draped with moss-covered cypress trees and tupelo. The banks were veritable cascades of cypress knees. It was only navigable by pirogue or canoe. During the 18th century, few Acadians settled the rougher northwestern prairies. Four families (29 people) made their home between Bayou Des Cannes and Bayou Blaize LeJeune.  This was the farthest west that Acadians would settle until in 1803, seven Opelousas Acadian families moved to Bayou Mallet, Bayou Jonas, Bayou Nezpique and Bayou des Cannes.

During the 1930s, the Point-Aux-Loups (point-ah-loo) (French for "Wolves Point") Springs Ballroom was originally built by the Louisiana Irrigation & Mills Company. This brick structure served as the main pumping plant which serviced southwest Louisiana farmers with irrigation to their rice crops.

See also
List of rivers in Louisiana

References

External links
 Map of the southwestern Bayou region

Rivers of Louisiana
Rivers of Acadia Parish, Louisiana